La Shawn K. Ford is an American politician who is a Democratic member of the Illinois House of Representatives, representing the 8th District since 2007.

Ford was a candidate for Mayor of Chicago in the 2019 election.

Early life, education, and career
Elected in 2007 to the Illinois House of Representatives representing the 8th District, Rep. Ford is an outspoken advocate for his constituents. Rep. Ford is focused on social justice and disparities in employment, education, and the healthcare system. He has also worked to increase opportunities for ex-offenders, foster small business development, improve access to affordable housing, expand protections for our veterans, safeguard our environment and address our state’s fiscal health.

Ford was born in Chicago's Cabrini–Green housing project. He grew up in the Austin community of Chicago. His family moved to the Austin community when he was two years old. Ford never met his father. His mother was an unwed teen, and he was adopted by his grandmother at birth.

Ford grew up poor.

Ford attended Lady Help of Christians Catholic Elementary School and graduated from Weber High School.

Initially, after high school, Ford attended the Niles College Seminary at Loyola University in Chicago contemplating becoming a priest. Ford ultimately received a bachelor of arts in elementary education from Loyola, with a minor in political science. He played basketball while at Loyola. He also received a degree from University of Illinois at Chicago.

Ford became a history teacher and basketball coach for Chicago Public Schools. Later he became a licensed Illinois real estate broker, and became the founder of Ford Desired Real Estate in 2001. He has served as a member of the Chicago and National Association of Realtors, board member of the Austin YMCA, board member of Circle Family Care, board member of the Austin Chamber of Commerce, founding organizer of Zawadi Youth Group, and member of St. Martin de Porres Catholic Church Parish Council and Finance Committee.

Ford worked as a Democratic precinct captain in the neighborhood where he grew up.

Ford is a firm believer in the power of responsible parenting and helped grow the Illinois Council on Responsible Fatherhood, which aims to support fathers and help them to become more responsible and present. He consistently advocates for increased access to financial resources and institutions for marginalized communities and promotes the value of education among students in his district.

Legislative career
Ford was first elected to the Illinois House of Representatives in 2007, defeating incumbent Calvin Giles in the Democratic primary and winning the General Election with 83% of the vote.

La Shawn is a national leader in social justice and civil rights issues. He believes in preserving communities, helping ex-offenders re-enter society and enshrining the sacred right to vote. He created a commission to confront economic problems that still plague Black communities, as well as the Distressed Counties and Communities Task Force, which finds innovative ways to help people who receive state social services and serves as a national model for a successful anti-poverty agenda.

Throughout his career, Ford has Chaired a number of committees: Appropriations—Higher Education; Financial Institutions, Restorative Justice. Ford's committee assignments are: the Appropriations Committee on Elementary & Secondary Education; Appropriations Committee on Human Services; Insurance: Property & Casualty; Tourism, Hospitality & Craft Industries; and Veterans' Affairs.

Ford is a member of the Medicaid Managed Care Oversight Task Force.
To monitor how the State approaches and manages a new form of health care delivery system based on managed care models,
particularly for people with disabilities and the elderly. He is also a member of the Violence Prevention Task Force. The Violence Prevention Task Force seeks to increase awareness of resources, jobs, and opportunities to prevent violence and to assist violence prevention groups and other social institutions in providing safe places for those at risk of violence.

From 2006 until 2012, Ford had received $16,350 in campaign contributions from labor unions. This included $3,000 from AFL-CIO, $2,650 from AFSCME, $200 from Illinois Education Association; $2,500 from the Illinois Federation of Teachers, $7,000 from the Chicago Teachers Union, $1,000 from Service Employees International Union.

In 2020, Ford voiced support for the abolition of history classes in Illinois schools, claiming that "current history teaching practices overlook the contributions by Women and members of the Black, Jewish, LGBTQ communities and other groups" and "until a suitable alternative is developed, we should instead devote greater attention toward civics and ensuring students understand our democratic processes and how they can be involved".

As of July 2, 2022, Representative Ford is a member of the following Illinois House committees:

 (Chairman of) Appropriations - Higher Education Committee (HAPI)
 Fair Lending and Community Reinvestment Subcommittee (HFIN-FAIR)
 Financial Institutions Committee (HFIN)
 Labor & Commerce Committee (HLBR)
 Public Utilities Committee (HPUB)
 Restorative Justic Committee (SHRJ)

Since 2007, La Shawn Ford has been re-elected six times to continue his advocacy for the 8th District, a diverse set of communities including the West Side of Chicago and the suburbs of Oak Park, Berwyn, North Riverside, Forest Park, Proviso Township, Brookfield, La Grange Park, La Grange and Western Springs.

2019 mayoral campaign
Ford ran for mayor of Chicago in 2019. After giving notice of a possible candidacy in late-September, Ford officially announced his candidacy on October 31, 2018, joining what was an already-crowded field of candidates seeking to replace Rahm Emanuel, who had announced in early September that he would not seek reelection.

Candidate Willie Wilson challenged signatures on Ford's candidature petition, but the Chicago Board of Elections allowed Ford to remain on the ballot, finding that, "candidate Willie Wilson's objection to his petitions was not made in good faith."

In the polls he was included in, Ford never placed higher than 2%, and most frequently received around 1% support.

Ford placed eleventh out of fourteen candidates, receiving 5,606 votes (1.01% of the overall vote) in the initial round of the election.

Personal life
Ford has a daughter named Tia.

Legal issues
On November 29, 2012, Ford was indicted on charges of bank fraud, alleging he provided misleading evidence to obtain a $500,000 extension on a line of credit. The charges state he used the money for personal expenses rather than rehabilitating an owned property, as stated in the loan documentation. On August 4, 2014, all 17 felony counts of bank fraud and false information against Ford were dropped by federal prosecutors in exchange for his pleading guilty to a single misdemeanor income tax charge, and Ford's trial was removed from the federal docket.

Electoral history

References

External links
Representative LaShawn Ford (D) 8th District at the Illinois General Assembly
By session: 100th, 99th, 98th, 97th, 96th, 95th
 
La Shawn Ford at Illinois House Democrats

Democratic Party members of the Illinois House of Representatives
Year of birth missing (living people)
Living people
Loyola University Chicago alumni
African-American state legislators in Illinois
Politicians from Chicago
21st-century American politicians
Illinois politicians convicted of crimes
Date of birth missing (living people)
21st-century African-American politicians
African-American Catholics